Charles Daniel Bennett (born November 23, 1979) is an American mixed martial artist currently competing in the featherweight division. He is also a bare-knuckle boxer who is currently signed to Bare Knuckle Fighting Championship (BKFC).

Characterized by his unpredictable and explosive fighting style and persona, Bennett has been a professional competitor since 1999, with time spent in PRIDE Fighting Championships, Rizin FF, EliteXC, King of the Cage, World Extreme Fighting, and ShoXC. Although he has never won a championship in MMA, Bennett has gained a considerable cult following among fans.

Background
Bennett was born in Gainesville, Florida, and is the second-oldest boy of 11 siblings. Bennett lived in Gainesville for the first eight years of his life before moving to Ocala, Florida to live with his father after his mother was arrested on a drug charge. Bennett had a troubled upbringing as he came from a broken home, often getting into fights, and both of his parents abused crack cocaine. Growing up, Bennett was a self-described "black sheep" of the family, but was very athletic and was a talented football player in high school, where he played running back, linebacker, and was even a defensive lineman despite his small stature. However, Bennett was kicked off of the team during his sophomore year. During his junior year, his father kicked him out of the house. Bennett eventually dropped out of high school, and turned his attention to selling narcotics. In between jail stints, he found a newspaper advertisement for a mixed martial arts gym in Ocala, and decided to sign up and join the gym. His coaches were very impressed with his speed and strength, but at the time, Bennett was still dealing drugs. Eventually, Bennett stopped selling narcotics, and focused on mixed martial arts, motivated by the birth of his first child to change his lifestyle—although he continued to be arrested on drug charges until 2011. Bennett also credits King of the Cage owner Terry Trebilcock Jr. in helping turn his life around.

Mixed martial arts career

Early career
In September 1999 and at only 19 years old, Bennett made his professional debut or a regional promotion in Atlanta, Georgia, competing in the lightweight weight class, where he lost to John Swift via submission. In his next bout a year later, he received his first professional win after he knocked out Todd Carney with a slam in the first round at the New Blood Conflict event for World Extreme Fighting. In Bennett's second WEF bout, he lost to Rich Clementi after tapping out to strikes in the first round. Bennett won his next two fights via strikes , before making his King of the Cage debut at KOTC 10 against Duane Ludwig. Bennett lost after he submitted due to exhaustion in the second round. Bennett then won 9 of his next 10 fights, including a win over former U.S. Marine Gerald Strebendt via submission due to strikes. His four-fight winning streak was snapped by future Pancrase Featherweight Champion Takumi Nakayama via submission.

Pride Fighting Championship and King of the Cage
With a record of 12-5, Bennett signed with Japanese promotion Pride Fighting Championships, making his promotional debut against Takanori Gomi at Pride FC: Bushido 5 on October 14, 2004, in what was also Bennett's overseas debut. Bennett lost via kimura within the first round. After a return to King of the Cage in which he achieved mixed results, Bennett returned to Pride at Pride FC: Bushido 7 on May 22, 2005, defeating Yoshiro Maeda via knockout just under two minutes in the first round.

On September 25, Bennett made his next appearance for the promotion at Pride FC: Bushido 9 , losing a bout to Dokonjonosuke Mishima by submission in the first round. After failing to capture the King of the Cage Bantamweight Championship fight against future WEC Featherweight Champion Urijah Faber, Bennett fought at Pride FC: Shockwave 2005 against Japanese fighter Ken Kaneko, and won via armbar submission. After winning the bout, Bennett tackled the referee, who in response pulled out a yellow card.

After his bout with Kaneko, Bennett was involved in a backstage altercation with Cristiano Marcello, a member of the Chute Boxe Academy. In a video posted on Chute Boxe's official website, Bennett is seen attacking Marcello. Bennett supposedly insulted the Chute Boxe Academy and Wanderlei Silva, prompting a scuffle between Marcello and Bennett. Bennett charged at Marcello while throwing punches, and both men went to the ground, where Marcello put Bennett to sleep with a triangle choke before the fight was broken up.

On June 4, 2006, Bennett made his last appearance for the organization in at Pride FC: Bushido 11  against Tatsuya Kawajiri. Bennett lost the bout via kneebar submission in the first round. He held a record of 2-3 with the promotion.

EliteXC
On February 10, 2007, Bennett made his debut for EliteXC, at the company's inaugural event EliteXC: Destiny against K. J. Noons. Bennett defeated Noons via knockout in an upset.

Later career and other ventures
In 2004, Bennett, along with fighters Din Thomas and Aaron Riley, appeared in the Chris Fuller film Loren Cass.

In September 2010, Bennett showed up at the tryouts for The Ultimate Fighter: Team GSP vs. Team Koscheck, but did not make it to the final cast.

Return to MMA
In October 2015, after being away from the sport for nearly three years, Bennett returned to active MMA competition for his former organization, King of the Cage.  Bennett fought six times in the next eleven months, and posted a record of four wins and two losses.

In September 2016, Bennett made an appearance for Rizin Fighting Federation, and competed in the featherweight division. He defeated Minoru Kimura by technical knockout in 7 seconds of the first round at the Rizin World Grand Prix 2016: 1st Round. After the fight, Bennett called out long-time rival Wanderlei Silva in an attempt to fight him, which did not occur. The callout later went viral on the internet due to Bennetts erratic nature, calling Silva 'Candylei' and ending it by saying that he 'could run fast', along with using a racial slur to describe himself.

Bare-knuckle fighting

Bare Knuckle Fighting Championship
On August 25, 2018, Bennett faced Michael McDonald at a Bare Knuckle FC event. He lost the fight via TKO in the 4th round with 10 seconds left.

Bennett made his sophomore appearance in the sport against Johnny Bedford at Bare Knuckle Fighting Championship 9: Lobov vs. Knight 2 on November 16, 2019. He lost the fight via second-round technical knockout due to a hand injury.

He then faced Tyler Goodjohn at Bare Knuckle Fighting Championship 15: Shewmaker vs. O'Bannon on December 11, 2020. He lost the fight via unanimous decision.

Gamebred Fighting Championship
On June 18, 2021, Bennett faced Jason Knight for the main event of Jorge Masvidal's Gamebred Fighting Championship (GFC), a typical MMA bout but contested bare-knuckle style. Bennett knocked down Knight early, and opened up a cut on his face, but would be taken down and submitted with a rear-naked choke in round one.

On October 1, 2021, Bennett faced Rob Emerson in the co-main event of Gambred FC 2. He lost by knockout with 24 seconds left in the first round.

Legal troubles
Between 1999 and 2009, he was arrested 14 times on charges that included: selling cocaine, burglary, aggravated battery on a pregnant woman, and possession of MDMA. The charge of aggravated battery on a pregnant woman relating to an incident from 2002 was dropped; he was found guilty on two drug charges in 2000 and 2001, and was also found guilty for another aggravated battery in 2008, which stemmed from a domestic dispute.

On January 16, 2011, Bennett was training at a gym in Bernalillo County, New Mexico, and got into a physical altercation with a teammate. According to a police report, tempers flared between the two, and the other fighter knocked down Bennett, who then got dressed and left the building. However, Bennett unexpectedly returned 15 minutes later armed with a heavy piece of steel, and attacked the fighter from behind. He was charged with aggravated battery.

In 2013, he was again arrested for battery.

Personal life
Bennett is divorced and has two kids.

Mixed martial arts record

| Loss
| align=center| 30–43–2
|Rob Emerson
| KO (punches)  
| Gamebred FC 2
| 
| align=center| 1
| align=center| 4:36
| Biloxi, Mississippi, United States
| 
|-
| Loss
| align=center| 30–42–2
|Jason Knight
| Submission (rear-naked choke) 
| Gamebred FC 1 
| 
| align=center| 1
| align=center| 2:15 
| Biloxi, Mississippi, United States
| 
|-
| Loss
| align=center| 30–41–2
| Kevin Croom
| Submission (rear-naked choke) 
| Fighting Alliance Championship 1 
| 
| align=center| 1
| align=center| 2:15 
| Independence, Missouri, United States
|
|-
| Loss
| align=center| 30–40–2
| Zach Shaw
| Submission (rear-naked choke) 
| TWC: Bennett vs. Shaw
| 
| align=center| 1
| align=center| 3:29
| Lansing, Michigan, United States
|
|-
| Loss
| align=center| 30–39–2
| James Freeman
| Technical Submission (rear-naked choke) 
| Island Fights 48 
| 
| align=center| 2
| align=center| 0:44
| Pensacola, Florida, United States
|
|-
| Loss
| align=center| 30–38–2
| Bruce Lutchmedial
| Decision (unanimous)
| CamSoda Legends
| 
| align=center| 3
| align=center| 5:00
| Fort Lauderdale, Florida, United States
| 
|-
| Loss
| align=center| 30–37–2
| Brok Weaver
| Decision (split)
| Island Fights 46
| 
| align=center| 3
| align=center| 5:00
| Pensacola, Florida, United States
|
|-
| Loss
| align=center| 30–36–2
| Cody Pfister
| Submission (rear naked choke)
| Fist Fight Night 2: Pfister vs Felony
| 
| align=center| 1
| align=center| 2:36
| Amarillo, Texas, United States
| 
|-
| Loss
| align=center| 30–35–2
| Ray Cooper III
| TKO (punches)
| X-1: Braddah vs. Felony
| 
| align=center| 2
| align=center| 2:48
| Honolulu, Hawaii, United States
| 
|-
| Loss
| align=center| 30–34–2
| Balajin
| Submission (choke)
| Kunlun Fight MMA 13
| 
| align=center| 2
| align=center| 0:55
| Jining, China
| 
|-
| Loss
| align=center| 30–33–2
| Zhenhong Lu
| TKO (corner stoppage)
| Kunlun Fight MMA 11
| 
| align=center| 1
| align=center| 5:00
| Jining, China
|
|-
| Loss
| align=center| 30–32–2
| Cody Stevens
| Decision (unanimous)
| RFO Big Guns 23
| 
| align=center| 3
| align=center| 5:00
| Cleveland, Ohio, United States
|
|-
| Loss
| align=center| 30–31–2
| Lawrence Fitzpatrick	
| Submission (rear-naked choke)
| Tanko Fighting Championships 3
| 
| align=center| 1
| align=center| 4:42
| Manchester, United Kingdom
| 
|-
| Win
| align=center| 30–30–2
| Minoru Kimura
|TKO (punches)
| Rizin World Grand-Prix 2016
| 
| align=center| 1
| align=center| 0:07
|Saitama, Japan
|
|-
| Win
| align=center| 29–30–2
| Paul Rodriguez
| Submission (heel hook)
| Battleground: Perry vs. Mundell
| 
| align=center| 1
| align=center| 0:43
| Kissimmee, Florida, United States
| 
|-
| Loss
| align=center| 28–30–2
| Matt DiMarcantonio
| Decision (unanimous)
| KOTC: Extreme Horsepower
| 
| align=center| 3
| align=center| 5:00
| Niagara Falls, New York, United States
| 
|-
| Win
| align=center| 28–29–2
| Terrell Hobbs
| Submission (heel hook)
| EWC 9: Takeover
| 
| align=center| 1
| align=center| 1:17
| Salem, Virginia, United States
|
|-
| Loss
| align=center| 27–29–2
| Jimmy Zidek
| Decision (split)
| KOTC: Thunder & Lightning
| 
| align=center| 3
| align=center| 5:00
| Carlton, Minnesota, United States
| 
|-
| Win
| align=center| 27–28–2
| Danny Black
| KO (punches) 
| KOTC: Harvest of Champions
| 
| align=center| 1
| align=center| 1:41
| Sloan, Iowa, United States
|
|-
| Loss
| align=center| 26–28–2
| Ronnie Rogers
| Submission (triangle choke)
| Warfare 7: Invasion
| 
| align=center| 1
| align=center| 3:45
| Myrtle Beach, South Carolina, United States
| 
|-
| Loss
| align=center| 26–27–2
| Johnavan Vistante
| Decision (unanimous)
| Destiny MMA: Na'Koa
| 
| align=center| 5
| align=center| 5:00
| Honolulu, Hawaii, United States
|  
|-
| Loss
| align=center| 26–26–2
| Chris McDaniel
| Submission (triangle choke)
| ShoFight 20
| 
| align=center| 1
| align=center| 2:52
| Springfield, Missouri, United States
| 
|-
| Win
| align=center| 26–25–2
| John Mahlow
| TKO (punches)
| Art of Fighting 15
| 
| align=center| 1
| align=center| 3:23
| Jacksonville, Florida, United States
| 
|-
| Loss
| align=center| 25–25–2
| Peter Grimes
| Submission (guillotine choke)
| CFA 06: Palomino vs. Warfield
| 
| align=center| 2
| align=center| 3:36
| Miami, Florida, United States
| 
|-
| Loss
| align=center| 25–24–2
| Luis Palomino
| KO (punch)
| CFA 04: Izquierdo vs. Cenoble
| 
| align=center| 1
| align=center| 3:59
| Coral Gables, Florida, United States
| 
|-
| Win
| align=center| 25–23–2
| Michael Casteel
| TKO (slam and punches)
| KOTC: Rising Sun
| 
| align=center| 1
| align=center| 0:56
| Santa Fe, New Mexico, United States
| 
|-
| Loss
| align=center| 24–23–2
| Matt Muramoto
| Submission (rear-naked choke)
| KOTC: Shockwave
| 
| align=center| 1
| align=center| 2:48
| Oroville, California, United States
|  
|-
| Loss
| align=center| 24–22–2
| Jason Gybels
| Submission (rear-naked choke)
| UCS: Caged Combat 3
| 
| align=center| 3
| align=center| 4:14
| Grand Ronde, Oregon, United States
| 
|-
| Loss
| align=center| 24–21–2
| John Harris
| Decision (split)
| Hess Extreme Fighting
| 
| align=center| 3
| align=center| 5:00
| Panama City Beach, Florida, United States
| 
|-
| Loss
| align=center| 24–20–2
| Fábio Mello
| Decision (split)
| World Extreme Fighting 45
| 
| align=center| 3
| align=center| 5:00
| Jacksonville, Florida, United States
| 
|-
| Loss
| align=center| 24–19–2
| Drew Fickett
| Submission (guillotine choke)
| Shine Fights: Lightweight Grand Prix
| 
| align=center| 1
| align=center| 3:34
| Newkirk, Oklahoma, United States
| 
|-
| Win
| align=center| 24–18–2
| Harris Norwood
| Submission (guillotine choke)
| WEF: World Extreme Fighting
| 
| align=center| 2
| align=center| 4:55
| Kissimmee, Florida, United States
| 
|-
| Loss
| align=center| 23–18–2
| Sterling Ford
| Decision (unanimous)
| Action Fight League: Rock-N-Rumble 3
| 
| align=center| 3
| align=center| 5:00
| Hollywood, Florida, United States
| 
|-
| Loss
| align=center| 23–17–2
| Bobby Green
| KO (punches)
| KOTC: Fight 4 Hope
| 
| align=center| 1
| align=center| 2:17
| San Bernardino, California, United States
| 
|-
| Win
| align=center| 23–16–2
| Eric Moon
| KO (punches)
| KOTC: Super Stars
| 
| align=center| 1
| align=center| 3:32
| Highland, California, United States
| 
|-
| Loss
| align=center| 22–16–2
| Anthony McDavitt
| Decision (split)
| KOTC: Legends
| 
| align=center| 3
| align=center| 3:00
| Winterhaven, California, United States
| 
|-
| Win
| align=center| 22–15–2
| Donnie Martinez
| Submission (guillotine choke)
| KOTC: Hierarchy
| 
| align=center| 1
| align=center| 1:39
| Albuquerque, New Mexico, United States
| 
|-
| Loss
| align=center| 21–15–2
| Victor Valenzuela
| TKO (submission to punches)
| ShoXC: Elite Challenger Series
| 
| align=center| 1
| align=center| 3:23
| Vicksburg, Mississippi, United States
| 
|-
| Win
| align=center| 21–14–2
| Dan Loman
| KO (punch)
| KOTC: Battle at the Bowl
| 
| align=center| 2
| align=center| 3:15
| Wisconsin, United States
| 
|-
| Win
| align=center| 20–14–2
| Robert Martz
| KO (slam)
| KOTC: Caged Chaos
| 
| align=center| 1
| align=center| 0:29
| Laughlin, Nevada, United States
| 
|-
| Win
| align=center| 19–14–2
| K. J. Noons
| KO (punch)
| EliteXC: Destiny
| 
| align=center| 1
| align=center| 3:43
| Southaven, Mississippi, United States
| 
|-
| Win
| align=center| 18–14–2
| Adam Bourke
| TKO (submission to punches)
| KOTC: Australia
| 
| align=center| 2
| align=center| N/A
| Australia
| 
|-
| Loss
| align=center| 17–14–2
| Tatsuya Kawajiri
| Submission (kneebar)
| PRIDE Bushido 11
| 
| align=center| 1
| align=center| 2:30
| Saitama, Japan
| 
|-
| Loss
| align=center| 17–13–2
| Buddy Clinton
| Submission (rear-naked choke)
| KOTC: Drop Zone
| 
| align=center| 1
| align=center| 0:18
| Michigan, United States
| 
|-
| Loss
| align=center| 17–12–2
| Jeff Curran
| Submission (armbar)
| KOTC: Redemption on the River
| 
| align=center| 1
| align=center| 4:32
| Illinois, United States
| 
|-
| Win
| align=center| 17–11–2
| Ken Kaneko
| Submission (armbar)
| PRIDE FC: Shockwave 2005
| 
| align=center| 1
| align=center| 4:14
| Saitama, Japan
| 
|-
| Loss
| align=center| 16–11–2
| Urijah Faber
| Submission (rear-naked choke)
| GC 46: Avalanche
| 
| align=center| 1
| align=center| 4:38
| California, United States
|  
|-
| Loss
| align=center| 
| Dokonjonosuke Mishima
| Submission (ankle lock)
| PRIDE Bushido 9
| 
| align=center| 1
| align=center| 4:04
| Tokyo, Japan
|  
|-
| Loss
| align=center| 16–9–2
| John Gunderson
| Submission (rear-naked choke)
| Gladiator Challenge 40
| 
| align=center| 2
| align=center| 1:28
| Oregon, United States
| 
|-
| Draw
| align=center| 16–8–2
| Victor Valenzuela
| Draw
| KOTC 58: Prime Time
| 
| align=center| 2
| align=center| 5:00
| California, United States
| 
|-
| Win
| align=center| 16–8–1
| Gabe Rivas
| TKO (injury)
| KOTC 56: Caliente
| 
| align=center| 1
| align=center| 2:21
| Arizona, United States
| 
|-
| Win
| align=center| 15–8–1
| Theo McDonald
| TKO (punches)
| KOTC 55: Grudge Match
| 
| align=center| 1
| align=center| 4:40
| Mexico
| 
|-
| Win
| align=center| 14–8–1
| Yoshiro Maeda
| KO (punch)
| PRIDE Bushido 7
| 
| align=center| 1
| align=center| 1:55
| Tokyo, Japan
| 
|-
| Draw
| align=center| 13–8–1
| Gabe Rivas
| Draw
| KOTC 49: Soboba
| 
| align=center| 2
| align=center| 5:00
| California, United States
| 
|-
| Loss
| align=center| 13–8
| Forrest Petz
| Submission (arm-triangle choke)
| KOTC 48: Payback
| 
| align=center| 1
| align=center| 3:40
| Ohio, United States
| 
|-
| Win
| align=center| 13–7
| Victor Hernandez
| KO (slam)
| KOTC 47: Uprising
| 
| align=center| 1
| align=center| 0:11
| Mexico
| 
|-
| Loss
| align=center| 12–7
| Dave Hisquierdo
| Submission (arm-triangle choke)
| KOTC 44: Revenge
| 
| align=center| 2
| align=center| 1:56
| California, United States
| 
|-
| Loss
| align=center| 12–6
| Takanori Gomi
| Submission (kimura)
| PRIDE Bushido 5
| 
| align=center| 1
| align=center| 5:52
| Osaka, Japan
| 
|-
| Loss
| align=center| 12–5
| Takumi Nakayama
| Submission (rear-naked choke)
| KOTC 39: Hitmaster
| 
| align=center| 1
| align=center| 2:46
| California, United States
| 
|-
| Win
| align=center| 12–4
| William Sriyrapai
| Decision (unanimous)
| KOTC 37: Unfinished Business
| 
| align=center| 2
| align=center| 5:00
| California, United States
| 
|-
| Win
| align=center| 11–4
| Shad Smith
| KO (punches)
| KOTC 33: After Shock
| 
| align=center| 1
| align=center| 0:40
| California, United States
| 
|-
| Win
| align=center| 10–4
| Glen Mincer
| KO (punches)
| World Extreme Fighting
| 
| align=center| 1
| align=center| 2:08
| Florida, United States
| 
|-
| Win
| align=center| 9–4
| William Sriyrapai
| Decision (split)
| KOTC 29: Renegades
| 
| align=center| 2
| align=center| 5:00
| California, United States
| 
|-
| Loss
| align=center| 8–4
| Rick Davis
| Decision (unanimous)
| WEFC 1: Bring It On
| 
| align=center| 4
| align=center| 4:00
| Georgia
| 
|-
| Win
| align=center| 8–3
| Aristides Britto
| Submission (heel hook)
| Dixie Rumble
| 
| align=center| 1
| align=center| 3:09
| United States
| 
|-
| Win
| align=center| 7–3
| Scott Johnson
| TKO (punches)
| Rumble in the Valley
| 
| align=center| 1
| align=center| 2:00
| Florida, United States
| 
|-
| Win
| align=center| 6–3
| Gerald Strebendt
| TKO (submission to punches)
| GC 7: Casualties of War
| 
| align=center| 1
| align=center| 1:40
| California, United States
| 
|-
| Win
| align=center| 5–3
| Jon Weidler
| Decision (majority)
| RSF 5: New Blood Conflict
| 
| align=center| 3
| align=center| 4:00
| Georgia
| 
|-
| Win
| align=center| 4–3
| Todd Carney
| KO (punches)
| RSF 4: Circle of Truth
| 
| align=center| 1
| align=center| N/A
| Georgia
| 
|-
| Loss
| align=center| 3–3
| Duane Ludwig
| TKO (exhaustion)
| KOTC 10: Critical Mass
| 
| align=center| 2
| align=center| 2:38
| California, United States
| 
|-
| Win
| align=center| 3–2
| John Wehbey
| TKO (corner stoppage)
| RSF: Circle of Truth 1
| 
| align=center| 3
| align=center| 1:12
| Georgia
| 
|-
| Win
| align=center| 2–2
| Robert Irizarry
| TKO (submission to punches)
| World Extreme Fighting: Rumble at the Rodeo 2
| 
| align=center| 3
| align=center| 1:43
| Kissimmee, Florida, United States
| 
|-
| Loss
| align=center| 1–2
| Rich Clementi
| TKO (submission to punches)
| World Extreme Fighting: Rumble at the Rodeo 1
| 
| align=center| 1
| align=center| N/A
| align=center| N/A
| 
|-
| Win
| align=center| 1–1
| Todd Carney
| KO (slam)
| WEF: New Blood Conflict
| 
| align=center| 1
| align=center| 2:21
| N/A
| 
|-
| Loss
| align=center| 0–1
| John Swift
| Submission (rear-naked choke)
| Lionheart Invitational
| 
| align=center| 1
| align=center| 12:46
| Georgia
|

Bare knuckle record

|-
|Loss
|align=center|0–3
|Tyler Goodjohn 
|Decision (unanimous)
|Bare Knuckle Fighting Championship 15: Shewmaker vs. O'Bannon
|
|align=center|5
|align=center|2:00
|Biloxi, Mississippi, United States
|
|-
|Loss
|align=center|0–2
|Johnny Bedford
|TKO (hand injury)
|Bare Knuckle Fighting Championship 9: Lobov vs. Knight 2
|
|align=center|2
|align=center|2:00
|Biloxi, Mississippi, United States
|
|-
|Loss
|align=center|0–1
|Michael McDonald
|TKO (hand injury) 
|BKFC 2: A New Era
|
|align=center|4
|align=center|1:49
|Biloxi, Mississippi, United States
|
|-

See also
List of male mixed martial artists

References

External links

1979 births
Living people
American male mixed martial artists
African-American mixed martial artists
Mixed martial artists from Florida
Lightweight mixed martial artists
American people convicted of assault
Bantamweight mixed martial artists
Featherweight mixed martial artists
Mixed martial artists utilizing boxing
American male boxers
African-American boxers
Bare-knuckle boxers
Boxers from Florida
Sportspeople from Gainesville, Florida
20th-century African-American sportspeople
21st-century African-American sportspeople
21st-century American criminals
20th-century American criminals